Frances Ethel Scarborough (10 January 1880 – 9 December 1956) was an English pianist, composer and politician. She was born in Crouch End, London and died in Graffham, Sussex. She conducted her own works at the Promenade Concerts.

Scarborough was also active in the Conservative Party, for which she stood in Ebbw Vale at the 1935 United Kingdom general election, taking second place with 22.2% of the vote.

Works
Selected works include:
Promise, a fantasy
Concerto for piano
Concerto in C Minor for piano

References

1880 births
1956 deaths
20th-century classical composers
English classical composers
Women classical composers
20th-century English composers
Conservative Party (UK) parliamentary candidates
20th-century English women musicians
20th-century women composers